Albert Nyman (22 November 1872 – 9 March 1924) was a Finnish diver. He competed in the men's plain high diving event at the 1912 Summer Olympics.

References

External links
 

1872 births
1924 deaths
Finnish male divers
Olympic divers of Finland
Divers at the 1912 Summer Olympics
Divers from Helsinki
20th-century Finnish people